Skating involves any sports or recreational activity which consists of traveling on surfaces or on ice using skates, and may refer to:

Ice skating 
Ice skating, moving on ice by using ice skates
Figure skating, a sport in which individuals, duos, or groups perform on figure skates on ice
Synchronized skating, a sport where between eight and sixteen perform together as a team
Speed skating, a competitive form of ice skating in which the competitors race each other in traveling a certain distance on skates
Short-track speed skating, a form of competitive ice speed skating
Tour skating, a sport and recreational form of long distance ice skating on natural ice

Hard surface 
Roller skating, the traveling on surfaces with roller skates
Inline skating, traveling on surfaces with skates having one line of wheels
Freestyle slalom skating, a field of inline skating that involves performing tricks around a straight line of equally spaced cones
Vert skating, riding inline skates on a vert ramp
Aggressive inline skating, inline skating executed on specially designed inline skates with focus on grinding and spins
Inline speed skating, the roller sport of racing on inline skates
Artistic roller skating, a sport similar to figure skating but where contestants run on roller skates instead of ice skates
Road skating
Skateboarding, an action sport which involves riding and performing tricks using a skateboard

Snow 
Snow skating, using a hybrid of a skateboard and a snowboard on snow

See also 
Outline of sports
Skate (disambiguation)
Skating rink (disambiguation)
Skater (disambiguation)
Skating system